The 1993 Indianapolis Colts season was the 41st season for the team in the National Football League and tenth in Indianapolis. The Indianapolis Colts finished the National Football League's 1993 season with a record of 4 wins and 12 losses, and finished fifth in the AFC East division. The Colts would get off to a fast 2–1 start. However, after that, the Colts would go into a tailspin for the rest of the season, losing 11 of their final 13 games. The Colts offense was abysmal during the season, scoring only 189 points all season, the fewest in the league, and 3 of their 4 wins were by a 9 to 6 tally. Their only other win was a 23–10 win over the Cleveland Browns in week 4. For the first and only time in league history, all NFL teams played their 16-game schedule over a span of 18 weeks.

Offseason

NFL Draft

Personnel

Staff

Roster

Regular season

Schedule

Standings

References

See also 
 History of the Indianapolis Colts
 Indianapolis Colts seasons
 Colts–Patriots rivalry

Indianapolis Colts
Indianapolis Colts seasons
Colts